WONY is a campus radio station based out of Oneonta, New York, United States, on the campus of the State University of New York at Oneonta.

Description
WONY is the college radio station of the SUNY Oneonta.  It was founded in 1962 and current membership consists of over 50 students, faculty, and members of the community.  It broadcasts at 180 watts on 90.9 FM and an internet webcast.

Physical
WONY is located on the State University of New York College At Oneonta campus. WONY's antenna latitude is 42.452N and longitude is 75.064W.  The studios are located on the basement floor of the Hunt Union, across from the Red Dragon Theater and next to the Dragon Express mailroom.  The main control room of the station ("Studio A") contains the on-air equipment: the console, the main engineering rack, five microphones, two CD players (for rotation), a minidisc player, two turntables, a computer, and auxiliary cables to connect to DJs' personal equipment. The Music Library houses WONY's collection - at last approximation, it exceeded 12,000 CDs. As of April 2013, "Studio B" is now being used to record News and Station ID's. The second News Studio ("Studio C"), which was outfitted as a small recording space, is now the Operations Director's workspace, as well as a storage space.  Studio B contains an Alesis mixer, a Shure SM7B microphone, and a customized computer.   The news is recorded into WAV format using Adobe Audition software.  The Operations room houses WONY's important documents, miscellaneous equipment, and webcasting server.  The Music Office is a place for the genre directors to work.  CDs are sorted and reviewed here, using the station's Macintosh G3.  WONY is also home to the Sparaco Lounge, which is named after the station's first General Manager, Mr. Gary Sparaco.

In January 2018, the State University of New York College At Oneonta announced the station's move from Alumni Hall to Hunt Union with an expected completion before the beginning of the following semester.

In January 2020, official plans were confirmed for the station's move to Hunt Union, which anticipated completion in September 2020.

In October 2020, the move from Alumni Hall to Hunt Union was completed, a month after the anticipated completion.

E-Board
The current executive board:

Past executive boards:

Other important figures at WONY include the station's faculty advisor, Dr. Andrew Bottomley, former faculty advisor Dr. Dave Ring, Alumni Chair Liz White, baconer Mike Engelbrecht, digital archivist Alan Stevens, website manager Rick Heil, and the Chief Engineer, Dr. Bob Kafka.

Schedules
WONY is operated on a 24/7 freeform broadcast. Each show is 2 hours in length, beginning at the initial start time.

Schedule for the Fall 2022 semester is as follows:

Equipment Overview
The station uses older, retired (and potentially obsolete), professional broadcasting equipment, including:
Pacific Research and Engineering (now the Harris Corporation) Airwave Digital Console
Denon CD players
Sony minidisc players
Comrex codecs
TFT EAS 911 Emergency Alert System
Electrovoice and Shure microphones

External links and sources
WONY Official Website

ONY
Radio stations established in 1962
ONY
State University of New York at Oneonta